Galeh Dani Hajj Askar Jowkar (also Romanized as Galeh Dānī Ḩājj ‘Askar Jowkār) is a village in Deris Rural District, in the Central District of Kazerun County, Fars Province, Iran. At the 2006 census, its population was 79, in 23 families.

References 

Populated places in Kazerun County